The TUM School of Life Sciences (LS or formerly TUM WZW) is a school of the Technical University of Munich, located at its Weihenstephan campus in Freising. It encompasses the life sciences, in particular biology, agricultural science, food technology, landscape architecture, biotechnology, and nutrition.

History 
The School of Life Sciences can be traced back to the "School of Agriculture" and the "Central Tree Nursery for the Electorate Weihenstephan", founded in 1803. In 1855, the "Bavarian Agricultural Experiment Institute" was founded by Justus von Liebig, who made major contributions to agricultural and biological chemistry. In 1895, these institutes became the "Royal Bavarian Academy for Agriculture and Beer Brewing", and in 1928–1930 were merged into the Technische Hochschule München, which would later become the Technical University of Munich.

The campus in Weihenstephan was founded in 1970. In 1998, the TUM Department of Biology relocated to Weihenstephan, and in 1999, the Department of Forestry of the Ludwig Maximilian University of Munich was handed over to TUM.

In 2000, the TUM departments in Weihenstephan were consolidated into the Wissenschaftszentrum für Ernährung, Landnutzung und Umwelt (Center of Life and Food Sciences). In 2020, it became the present School of Life Sciences.

Departments 

The TUM School of Life Sciences is structured into three research departments:

Molecular Life Sciences 
 Animal Breeding
 Animal Hygiene
 Animal Nutrition
 Animal Physiology and Immunology
 Biochemical Plant Pathology
 Bioinformatics
 Biological Chemistry
 Biopolymer Chemistry
 Biotechnology of horticultural crops
 Biotechnology of Natural Products
 Botany
 Computational Neurosciences
 Crop Physiology
 Developmental Genetics
 Experimental Bioinformatics
 Experimental Genetics
 Food Chemistry and Molecular Sensory Science
 Human Biology
 Intestinal Microbiome
 Livestock Biotechnology
 Metabolic Programming
 Microbial Ecology
 Microbiology
 Molecular Nutritional Medicine
 Neuronal Control of Metabolism
 Nutrition and Immunology
 Nutritional Systems Biology
 Peptide Biochemistry
 Phytopathology
 Plant Breeding
 Plant Developmental Biology
 Plant Genetics
 Plant Systems Biology
 Population Epigenetics and Epigenomics
 Protein Modelling
 Proteomics and Bioanalytics
 Reproductive Biotechnology
 Technical Microbiology
 Zoology

Life Science Systems 
 Aquatic Systems Biology
 Atmospheric Environmental Research
 Ecoclimatology
 Ecological Cultivation
 Ecosystem Dynamics and Forest Management in Mountain Landscapes
 Forest and Agroforest Systems
 Forest Growth and Yield Science
 Forest Management
 Forest Nutrition and Water Resources
 Geomorphology and Soil Science
 Land Surface-Atmosphere Interactions
 Plant Biodiversity
 Plant-Insect Interactions
 Plant Nutrition
 Population Genetics
 Restoration Ecology
 Soil Science
 Strategic Landscape Planning and Management
 Terrestrial Ecology
 Urban Productive Ecosystems

Life Science Engineering 
 Agricultural Systems Engineering
 Agrimechatronics
 Analytical Food Chemistry
 Biothermodynamics
 Brewing and Beverage Technology
 Digital Agriculture
 Fluid Dynamics of Complex Biosystems
 Food and Bioprocess Engineering
 Fungal Biotechnology in Wood Science
 Precision Agriculture
 Process Systems Engineering
 Wood Science
 Wood Technology

Rankings 

The Times Higher Education World University Rankings ranks life sciences at TUM as 35th in the world and 3rd in Germany, after Heidelberg University and Ludwig Maximilian University of Munich.

In biology, the department is ranked No. 43 in the world and No. 3 in Germany in the QS World University Rankings. In the Academic Ranking of World Universities, it ranks No. 76-100 in the world and No. 5-9 in Germany. In the national 2020 CHE University Ranking, the department is rated in the top group for overall study situation, study organization, and infrastructure.

In biotechnology, ARWU ranks TUM as No. 49 in the world and No. 1 in Germany.

In agricultural science, the department is ranked 27th in the world and 2nd in Germany in the QS World University Rankings, trailing the University of Hohenheim. In the Academic Ranking of World Universities, it ranks No. 38 in the world and No. 2 in Germany.

In food science, ARWU ranks TUM as No. 37 in the world and No. 1 in Germany.

References

External links

 

 
2000 establishments in Germany
Educational institutions established in 2000